Jeando Pourrat Fuchs (born 11 October 1997) is a Cameroonian professional footballer who plays for EFL League One club Peterborough United and for the Cameroon national team.

Career
Fuchs started his senior career with French club Sochaux. He made over 100 league appearances for the club before moving to Spanish club Alavés in 2019. Alavés loaned him to Israeli club Maccabi Haifa during the 2019–20 season.

In October 2020, Fuchs signed a two-year contract with Scottish club Dundee United.

On 28 January 2022, Fuchs joined Championship side Peterborough United for an undisclosed fee, signing a two-and-a-half year deal with the club.

International career
Fuchs represented the France national youth teams up until the France U20, but chose to represent Cameroon on the senior level. He made his debut for Cameroon on 20 November 2018 in a friendly against Brazil, as a starter.

Career statistics

Honours

International
UEFA European Under-19 Championship: 2016

References

External links

 

1997 births
Living people
Footballers from Yaoundé
Association football midfielders
Cameroonian footballers
France youth international footballers
French footballers
French sportspeople of Cameroonian descent
Cameroon international footballers
FC Sochaux-Montbéliard players
Deportivo Alavés players
Maccabi Haifa F.C. players
Dundee United F.C. players
Ligue 2 players
La Liga players
Israeli Premier League players
Scottish Professional Football League players
French expatriate footballers
Cameroonian expatriate footballers
French expatriate sportspeople in Spain
French expatriate sportspeople in Israel
Cameroonian expatriate sportspeople in Spain
Cameroonian expatriate sportspeople in Israel
Expatriate footballers in Spain
Expatriate footballers in Israel
Cameroonian expatriate sportspeople in Scotland
Expatriate footballers in Scotland
Peterborough United F.C. players
Cameroonian expatriate sportspeople in England
Expatriate footballers in England
English Football League players